Melaleuca quercina, commonly known as Oakey bottlebrush is a plant in the myrtle family, Myrtaceae and is endemic to a small area of Queensland in Australia. (Some Australian state herbaria use the name Callistemon quercinus.) It is small tree with dark, corky bark and spikes of yellow, cream or pink bottlebrush flowers in spring and summer.

Description
The leaves have a mid-vein and 11–20 lateral veins.

The flowers are a shade of yellow or pink and are arranged in spikes  in diameter with 15 to 40 individual flowers.

Taxonomy and naming
Melaleuca quercina was first formally described in 2009 by Lyndley Craven in Novon from a specimen found near Oakey Creek. The specific epithet (quercina) refers to the oak genus Quercus in the beech family Fagaceae and hence the location Oakey Creek near Oakey in Queensland.

Callistemon quercinus is regarded as a synonym of Melaleuca quercina by the Royal Botanic Gardens, Kew.

Distribution and habitat
Melaleuca quercina occurs in the Oakey and Dalby districts in Queensland, where it grows along the banks and flats of creeks in dark clay soils.

References

quercina
Flora of Queensland
Plants described in 2009
Taxa named by Lyndley Craven